Claude Legris (born November 6, 1956) is a Canadian former professional ice hockey player who played four games in the National Hockey League with the Detroit Red Wings during the 1980–81 and 1981–82 seasons. The rest of his career, which lasted from 1976 to 1983, was spent in the minor leagues. As a youth, he played in the 1969 Quebec International Pee-Wee Hockey Tournament with a minor ice hockey team from Verdun.

Career statistics

Regular season and playoffs

Awards
1980–81: James Norris Memorial Trophy, Kalamazoo Wings (co-winner with Georges Gagnon)

References

External links
 

1956 births
Living people
Adirondack Red Wings players
Canadian ice hockey goaltenders
Detroit Red Wings draft picks
Detroit Red Wings players
French Quebecers
Johnstown Red Wings players
Kalamazoo Wings (1974–2000) players
People from Verdun, Quebec
San Diego Mariners draft picks
Sorel Éperviers players
Ice hockey people from Montreal
Springfield Indians players
Trois-Rivières Draveurs players